The Franceville Basin is a 1.6–2.1 billion year old sedimentary basis in Gabon. It contains unmetamorphosed sediments. It is notable for containing the Francevillian Biota, which is likely the oldest multicellular life known. A natural fission reactor formed there about 1.8 - 2.1 billion years ago.

Geology 
The Franceville Basin cover approximately 25,000 km2 and is made up of unmetamorphosed sediment derived mainly from eroded Mesoarchaean tonalite–trondhjemite–granodiorites. It is over a kilometer thick, with various sources claiming 2.5-4 kilometers as the maximum depth. Around 1.8-2.1 billion years ago a natural fission reactor formed, nicknamed the "Oklo reactor". The resulting fission by-products were held in place by a clay layer.

See also 
Francevillian Biota
Francevillian B Formation

References 

Geology of Gabon